Ceredwen (pronounced ker-ED-wen) is a Celtic band comprising Andrew Fryer and Renee Gray. The name comes from the Celtic goddess of inspiration and legendary mother of Taliesin, King Arthur's bard and "Keeper of the Cauldron". Their debut album, Ô'r Mabinogi (Legends of the Celts) (1997), featured in the Billboard charts for 3 months and won 3 NAV awards. Their second album, The Golden Land (1999), was also successful.

History
Gray hails from South Wales and also plays in the Lucys, a Celtic folk-rock band; Fryer is an Englishman who formed his first band when he was 13 and works as a songwriter and independent record producer. Ceredwen's 1997 debut album O'r Mabinogi was inspired by the tales ancient Celtic storytellers told of their ruler's heroic deeds, and featured real and sampled Celtic instruments like the bodhran, pennywhistle, flute and uilleann pipes along with contemporary rhythms and Gray's vocals. Their follow-up, 1999's Golden Land, followed a similar musical path and used the Druids' fight against the invading Roman army as source material.

Ceredwen are signed to Real Music in the US.

Their music has been compared to that of Enya due to its use of traditional instruments and ambient approach, but differs in its use of language. Enya sings in Irish whereas Ceredwen sing entirely in Welsh.

Discography
O'r Mabinogi (1997)
The Golden Land (1999)

References

External links
Reviews of the first two albums, musicaldiscoveries.com

Welsh folk musicians